Xanthoparmelia tinctina is a species of lichen from the family Parmeliaceae that can be found in Arizona, California, Northern Africa and Europe. The disc is either cinnamon-brown or dark brown and is ellipsoided. The pycnidia are immersed, and the conidia are bifusiform, with 8-spored asci that are hyaline and ellipsoid.

See also
List of Xanthoparmelia species

References

tinctina
Lichen species
Lichens described in 1925
Lichens of North Africa
Lichens of Europe
Lichens of North America